The 1931 Chattanooga Moccasins football team represented the University of Chattanooga in the Dixie Conference and the Southern Intercollegiate Athletic Association (SIAA) during the 1931 college football season. In Scrappy Moore's first season as head coach, the team compiled a 9–2 record overall and an 8–0 against SIAA opponents, winning the SIAA championship.

Schedule

References

Chattanooga
Chattanooga
Chattanooga Mocs football seasons
Chattanooga Moccasins football